Madison Keys was the defending champion, but withdrew with a wrist injury before the tournament began.

Petra Kvitová won the title, defeating Ashleigh Barty in the final, 4–6, 6–3, 6–2. This was Kvitová's first WTA title since recovering from injuries sustained during a home invasion.

Seeds

Draw

Finals

Top half

Bottom half

Qualifying

Seeds

Qualifiers

Lucky loser

Draw

First qualifier

Second qualifier

Third qualifier

Fourth qualifier

References
 Main Draw
 Qualifying Draw

Aegon Classicandnbsp;- Singles
Singles